Duggleby is a surname. Notable people with the surname include:

Adam Duggleby (born 1984), British cyclist
Bill Duggleby (1874–1944), American baseball player
Emma Duggleby (born 1971), English amateur golfer
Vincent Duggleby (born 1939), British financial journalist